Edward Henry Stuart Bligh, 7th Earl of Darnley (21 August 1851 – 31 October 1900), styled Lord Clifton until 1896, lord of the Manor of Cobham, Kent, was an English landowner and aristocrat who played first-class cricket for Kent and for other amateur sides in the 1870s. He was born and died at the English home of the Earls of Darnley, Cobham Hall, at Cobham, near Gravesend in Kent. 

"(Lord) Clifton"—as he often signed—was a well-known ornithologist.

Biography 
Described as "having a fearsome temper and being profligate", Bligh matriculated at Christ Church, Oxford on 8 June 1870. In 1896, Bligh succeeded his father as the Earl of Darnley and "spent money like water", greatly reducing the wealth of the Darnleys.

On 26 January 1899, he married Jemima Adeline Beatrice Blackwood (1880-1964), daughter of Francis James Lindsay Blackwood (1849-1919), by whom he had one daughter: Elizabeth Bligh, 17th Baroness Clifton (1900–1937).

Upon his death on 31 October 1900, he was succeeded as Earl of Darnley by his brother Ivo and as Baron Clifton by his infant daughter, Elizabeth.

Ornithology 
Edward Henry Stuart, Lord Clifton was elected MBOU, Member of the British Ornithologists' Union, in 1876. As "(Lord) Clifton" for many years he wrote small contributions to The Zoologist, beginning in 1866. His first contribution was about the observation of an ortolan bunting on 10 April 1866, at Cobham.

References

Sources
 Wynne-Thomas, P. & Griffiths, P. (2002) ‘’Ivo Bligh”, Famous Cricketers Series – No. 67, ACS Publications: Nottingham. .

1851 births
1900 deaths
Edward 07
People from Cobham, Kent
People from Gravesend, Kent
Alumni of Christ Church, Oxford
English cricketers
Kent cricketers
English landowners
Marylebone Cricket Club cricketers
Gentlemen of Marylebone Cricket Club cricketers
Edward 07
Barons Clifton
19th-century British businesspeople